Jelmer is a given name. Notable people with the given name include:
 Jelmer Beulenkamp (born 1977), Dutch speed skater
 Jelmer Steenhuis (born 1954), Dutch creator of puzzles and games
 Jelmer Wiersma, musician

See also
 Hjalmar (given name)

Dutch given names